"This Time I Know It's for Real" is a song by American singer-songwriter Donna Summer, released on February 13, 1989, as the first single from her 14th studio album, Another Place and Time (1989), by Atlantic Records and Warner Bros. Records. Like the rest of the album, the song was written and produced by the British Stock Aitken Waterman (SAW) team, though Summer also had a hand in writing this song.

Summer became aware of SAW after her husband, Bruce Sudano, drew her attention to their work during a visit to Europe. She was further encouraged by Rick Astley's subsequent success, saying she "loved his production". 

Hitting it off with the producers immediately, Summer recalled that the song came together on their first day working together, a rare case of "hitting the nail on the head the first time". While she was enthusiastic, her then US label boss David Geffen wanted a rockier sound with more guitars from the SAW sessions, a dictate which was immediately refused by Pete Waterman.

The song became Summer's biggest hit in the United Kingdom since the 1970s (during which time she had been the most popular female disco artist), reaching number three and spending a total of 14 weeks in the UK Singles Chart top 75, longer than any of her other singles there. 

It also reached number seven in both the United States and Canada, becoming her 14th and final US top-10 hit on the Billboard Hot 100 as well as the last top-40 hit of Summer's career. The song was also successful on the Billboard Hot Adult Contemporary chart, peaking at number two.

With Geffen Records ending her US deal due to an impasse over the new material, this was Summer's first US single to be released on Atlantic Records. Since 1980 she had been signed to Geffen, but her work across Europe had always been distributed by Warner Bros.' main label. This would continue to be the case following her signing to Atlantic.

Critical reception
Alex Henderson from AllMusic described the song as a "exuberant, club-friendly Euro-dance/Hi-NRG" gem. Jim Arundel from Melody Maker declared it as "gloriously driven, simple, joyous and just a bit sad too." Pan-European magazine Music & Media commented, "Very much a SAW production with Summer's voice adding a touch of class. Her first chance of a major hit since 1983's 'She Works Hard for the Money'." In an retrospective review, Pop Rescue also stated that the song "simply oozes S/A/W sound from the very first moment it bursts open with some very Rick Astley/Sonia-esque drums. This is textbook S/A/W and is absolutely flawless." In 2021, British magazine Classic Pop ranked the song number nine in their list of 'Top 40 Stock Aitken Waterman songs', underlining its success on the charts.

Music video
A music video was made to accompany the song, directed by Swiss director/editor and producer Dieter Trattmann. City destinations were London, UK to Shanghai, China to Honolulu, Hawaii to San Francisco, California to New York City, NY & back to London, UK.........

Track listings
 7-inch single
 "This Time I Know It's for Real" – 3:36
 "Whatever Your Heart Desires" (original mix) – 3:50

 12-inch maxi
 "This Time I Know It's for Real" (extended version) – 7:20
 "Whatever Your Heart Desires" (original mix) – 3:50
 "This Time I Know It's for Real" (instrumental) – 3:34

Charts

Weekly charts

Year-end charts

Certifications

Young Divas version

Australian girl group Young Divas covered "This Time I Know It's for Real" to coincide with nationwide tour dates from July to August 2006. The song was produced by George Papapetros and Max Kourilov and released as a CD single on May 6, 2006, to attract attention for the tour. "This Time I Know It's for Real" peaked at number two on the ARIA Singles Chart and spent 14 weeks in the top ten. It was certified platinum by the Australian Recording Industry Association (ARIA), for shipments of 70,000 copies. The song was later included on their self-titled debut album Young Divas. Due to an overwhelming response of the Young Divas' version of "This Time I Know It's for Real", a music video was filmed to accompany the song's release.

Track listing
 CD single
"This Time I Know It's for Real" (Radio Edit)
"This Time I Know It's for Real" (Extended Remix)

Credits and personnel
Vocals – Emily Williams, Kate DeAraugo, Paulini, Ricki-Lee Coulter
Songwriting – Donna Summer, Matt Aitken, Mike Stock, Pete Waterman
Production - George Papapetros, Max Kourilov 
Mixing – George Papapetros, Max Kourilov 
Arrangements – George Papapetros, Max Kourilov 
Mastering – Oscar Gaona, Tom Coyne

Source

Weekly chart

Year-end charts

Certification

Other cover versions
In 2004, British singer Kelly Llorenna reached number fourteen on the UK Singles Chart with her version of the song.

References

1989 songs
1989 singles
2006 singles
Donna Summer songs
Dance-pop songs
Synth-pop songs
Songs written by Donna Summer
Songs written by Mike Stock (musician)
Songs written by Matt Aitken
Songs written by Pete Waterman
Song recordings produced by Stock Aitken Waterman
Warner Records singles
Atlantic Records singles
Sony Music Australia singles